FlatOut 2 is an action racing video game developed by Bugbear Entertainment and published by Empire Interactive in Europe and Vivendi Universal Games in North America. It is the sequel to the 2004 game FlatOut.

This game is themed more on the street racing/import tuner scene than its predecessor. A notable change is the tire grip; players can take more control of their car, worrying less about skidding in tight turns. The game has three car classes: derby, race, and street.

It was released in Russia on June 29, 2006, in Europe on June 30, and in North America on August 1. In 2008, an OS X version of the game was released by Virtual Programming. In 2014, a Linux version of the game was released on GOG.com as part of the launch of Linux support.

An enhanced port was released in 2007 for the Xbox 360 and Windows as FlatOut: Ultimate Carnage. A PlayStation Portable port of Ultimate Carnage was released as FlatOut: Head On.

Gameplay

Ragdoll physics
The ragdoll physics in the sequel have been greatly updated. During the race, the driver may be thrown out of the car if slammed into a wall at a high speed. In the numerous stunt minigames the goal is to shoot themselves out of the car and complete objectives like knocking down a set of bowling pins, hitting the designated spots on a dartboard, score a field goal or fly through flaming hoops. Players must use 'aerobatics' to control the driver in-flight, but overusing it will increase drag, which will slow the driver down and possibly prevent him/her from reaching the designated target. If the driver falls short of the target, players can use the "nudge". This gives the driver a small upward boost and slightly reduces drag. In the Stone Skipping Stunt minigame, the players must use nudge just as the driver hits the surface of the water to skip the most efficiently and reach the furthest.

Reception

Critical reception

The PC version of FlatOut 2 received "generally favorable reviews", while the PlayStation 2 and Xbox versions received "average" reviews, according to the review aggregation website Metacritic.  In Japan, Famitsu gave the PS2 version a score of all four sevens for a total of 28 out of 40.

Awards
 Won IGN's award for Best PlayStation 2 Racing Game of 2006.
 Won X-Plays award for Best Racing Game of 2006.

FlatOut: Ultimate Carnage

FlatOut: Ultimate Carnage is an enhanced port of FlatOut 2 featuring new gameplay modes and graphics as well as at least two new cars. It was known earlier as FlatOut: Total Carnage. FlatOut: Ultimate Carnage was released on July 22, 2007 in Europe, on August 1 in Australia, and on October 2 in North America for the Xbox 360.

The Microsoft Windows version was released through the Steam network on August 26, 2008, and in stores on September 2. There is also a handheld version of the game for the PlayStation Portable called FlatOut: Head On, which was released in Australia on March 12, 2008, in Europe two days later, and in North America on April 4.

Gameplay
Ultimate Carnage introduces a brand new series of tracks which are based anywhere from busy streets to storm water drains.

The cars are more detailed than previous games in the series, employing the latest in dynamic lighting and shadow technology, and a greatly enhanced damage and physics engine where each car is made of up to 40 separate destructible parts. The single player game supports up to 11 other AI-controlled cars in each race.

A new multiplayer format is also included; this runs on the Games for Windows - Live system which requires the user to either sign into own Xbox LIVE or Games for Windows LIVE Gamertag, or sign up for one for free. The LAN function is not available in FlatOut: Ultimate Carnage, unlike the previous two FlatOut games for Windows.

Reception
The Xbox 360 and PC versions received "favorable" reviews, while the Head On version received "average" reviews, according to the review aggregation website Metacritic.

Hyper'''s Maurice Branscombe commended the Xbox 360 version for "looking and playing better than ever before", but did not like the soundtracks and stated that "the game's load times are too long". In Japan, Famitsu'' gave the same console version a score of three sevens and one six for a total of 27 out of 40.

References

External links
 
 
 

2006 video games
Bugbear Entertainment games
02
Games for Windows certified games
Linux games
Lua (programming language)-scripted video games
MacOS games
Multiplayer and single-player video games
PlayStation 2 games
PlayStation Portable games
Vehicular combat games
Video game sequels
Video games developed in Finland
Video games featuring protagonists of selectable gender
Windows games
Xbox games
Xbox 360 games
Empire Interactive games